Sidi Ahmed is a town in Youssoufia Province, Marrakesh-Safi, Morocco. As of the 2004 census, it has a population of 7,751.

References

Populated places in Youssoufia Province